Ferdinand Ducarre (21 November 1819, in Lhuis – 1 July 1883) was a French republican politician. He was a member of the National Assembly from 1871 to 1876. He belonged to the Opportunist Republican parliamentary group,  Gauche républicaine. He was a founding member of the Société de Géographie of Lyon.

References

1819 births
1883 deaths
People from Ain
Politicians from Auvergne-Rhône-Alpes
Opportunist Republicans
Members of the National Assembly (1871)